Ambjörby is a locality situated in Torsby Municipality, Värmland County, Sweden with 227 inhabitants in 2010.

Sports
The following sports clubs are located in Ambjörby:

 Nordvärmland FF

References 

Populated places in Torsby Municipality
Värmland